Ciudad Constitución is a city in the Mexican state of Baja California Sur. It is the seat of Comondú Municipality. As of 2019, the city had a total population of 45,888 inhabitants. Ciudad Constitución is a small city which serves as a gateway to Magdalena Bay.

History

The colonization of Valle de Santo Domingo (Valley of Santo Domingo) originated around 1940. A ranch called El Crucero (The Crossroad) was settled in a crossroad. Because of this, people started to gather around it and the population started to grow. It quickly became a commercial hub and an obligatory travel stop for all the inhabitants of Valle de Santo Domingo, as well as for people going north or south on the peninsula. Then, it became known as Villa Constitución, and later, Ciudad Constitución. Even today, many locals still call it "El Crucero". Every 5 February the city becomes the state's capital for one day. Since 1996, the Instituto Tecnológico Superior de Ciudad Constitución serves as a higher education institution.

Economy

Ciudad Constitución's mainstay is the cultivation of wheat, chickpea, cotton, asparagus, citrics, vegetables, among others crops. The city also has a dairy products processing plant (pasteurized milk, yogurt, fruit beverages): "Unión de Ejidos 20 de Noviembre". Ciudad Constitución has a few small hotels (Hotel El Conquistador, Hotel Conchita, Hotel Maribel, Hotel Ryal), supermarkets (Super Ley, Super Murillo), gas stations, travel agencies (Viajes Pedrín), etc.
The Mexican long distance area code for the municipalities of Comondú and Loreto is 613. Internet access is possible in cybercafes through the city's downtown, as well as by dial-up access from regular landlines. Communication with remote areas of Valle de Santo Domingo, nearby islands, and other remote regions of the municipality of Comondú is mainly possible by means of a local AM radio station (XEVSD 1440 kHz).

Climate

Transportation

For air travel, the city is served by the Ciudad Constitución Airport, which is a small airfield where two regional airlines provide service to Los Mochis and Ciudad Obregón. The airport also handles air taxi service. The city's nearest major airports are located in Loreto (Loreto International Airport), La Paz (Manuel Márquez de León International Airport) and San José del Cabo (Los Cabos International Airport). Small aircraft make use of local dirt runaways. Autotransportes Águila is a bus line which covers all the length of the Baja California Peninsula, mainly along Mexican Federal Highway 1 (also known as "Carretera Transpeninsular"), and has an office in Ciudad Constitución.

Demographics 

As of 2015, the city had a total population of 44,918 inhabitants. It is the fifth-largest community in the state (behind La Paz, San José del Cabo, Cabo San Lucas, and Colonia del Sol). Ciudad Constitución is a small city which serves as a gateway to Magdalena Bay. It is also close to the Baja 1000 course.

References

2010 census tables: INEGI: Instituto Nacional de Estadística, Geografía e Informática

External links
 Google Earth 

Comondú Municipality
Populated places in Baja California Sur
Municipality seats in Baja California Sur